Frank A. "Dutch" Sommer (January 1, 1886 – April 1, 1942) was an American football player and coach.  He served as the head football coach at Colgate University (1912), Pennsylvania Military College—now known as Widener University (1913), Villanova College—now Villanova University (1914–1915, 1924), and Michigan Agricultural College—now Michigan State University (1916), compiling a career record of 26–13–5.  Sommer coached at Colgate in 1912, where he compiled a record of 5–2.  He then coached at Villanova for 1914, 1915, and later for one season in 1924. His overall record there was 12–9–2. In his only season at Michigan Agricultural in 1916, Sommer led the Spartans to a 4–2–1 record. Sommer was an All-American halfback from the University of Pennsylvania. He earned a L.L.B. degree at Penn, graduating in 1913. Sommer died on April 1, 1942, at St. Mary's Hospital in Philadelphia.

Head coaching record

References

External links
 

1886 births
1942 deaths
American football halfbacks
American football tackles
Colgate Raiders football coaches
Michigan State Spartans football coaches
Villanova Wildcats football coaches
Widener Pride football coaches
Penn Quakers football players
Players of American football from Pennsylvania